Beckstead is a surname. Notable people with the surname include:

Alex Beckstead, American film director and producer
Ian Beckstead (born 1957), Canadian football player